The Giurgiu Power Station is a large thermal power plant located in Giurgiu, having 3 generation groups of 50 MW each resulting a total electricity generation capacity of 150 MW.

See also

 List of power stations in Romania

References

External links
Description 

Coal-fired power stations in Romania